Chloe O'Brien (born 28 April 2002) is a Scottish professional darts player who plays in Professional Darts Corporation (PDC) and World Darts Federation (WDF) events. Her biggest achievement to date was qualified for inaugural 2022 Women's World Matchplay.

Career
O'Brien started her career in numerous youth's tournaments, both locally and international. The first successes came relatively quickly, she became a series winner at least in her region. In 2019, she was selected by the national federation to participate in the 2019 WDF World Cup in youth's competitions. In singles competition she advanced to second phase, but lost to Ksenia Klochek in the second round match. In the pairs competition, together with Sophie McKinlay, she won the silver medal, lost in the final to Beau Greaves and Shannon Reeves from England. In mixed pairs competition, she won a bronze medal, played together with Nathan Girvan. Ultimately, Scotland also won a bronze medal in the overall youth ranking. O'Brien also participated in the 2019 World Masters for girls, but she lost to Wibke Riemann by 1–4 in legs, in the quarter-finals match.

In 2020, she performed at the 2020 Dutch Open. In the senior competition, she advanced to the sixth round, where she lost to Lorraine Winstanley by 1–3 in legs. In the youth's competition, she advanced to the semi-finals, but lost to Layla Brussel by 2–3 in legs. Her career was cut short by the coronavirus pandemic. In 2021, she participated only in two World Darts Federation tournaments, but lost in the first phases. She returned to regular competition in the 2022, participated in the 2022 PDC Women's Series. O'Brien twice made it to the semi-finals, but there were also many first-round defeats. Overall, her good results in few tournaments allowed her to qualify for the inaugural 2022 Women's World Matchplay. In the quarter-finals she faced Lisa Ashton and lost to her by 0–4 in legs.

At the end of September 2022, she was selected by the national federation to participate in the 2022 WDF Europe Cup. On the second day of the tournament, she advanced to the second round of the singles competition, where she lost to Vicky Pruim by 1–4 in legs. In the pairs and team competition, she did not achieve satisfactory results. Along with qualifying for 2022 Women's World Matchplay, she was invited to participate in the 2022 PDC World Youth Championship. In the group stage she faced Josh Rock and Lee Lok Yin. She lost both games and was eliminated from the tournament.

Performance timeline

References

Living people
2002 births
British Darts Organisation players
Scottish darts players
Professional Darts Corporation women's players